In probability theory, a stochastic process is said to have stationary increments if its change only depends on the time span of observation, but not on the time when the observation was started. Many large families of stochastic processes have stationary increments either by definition (e.g. Lévy processes) or by construction (e.g. random walks)

Definition 

Examples 
Having stationary increments is a defining property for many large families of stochastic processes such as the Lévy processes. Being special Lévy processes, both the Wiener process and the Poisson processes have stationary increments. Other families of stochastic processes such as random walks have stationary increments by construction.

In this special case, the increments are even independent of the duration of observation  itself.

Generalized Definition for Complex Index Sets 
The concept of stationary increments can be generalized to stochastic processes with more complex index sets .
Let  be a stochastic process whose index set   is closed with respect to addition. Then it has stationary increments if for any , the random variables

and

have identical distributions.
If  it is sufficient to consider .

References 

Stochastic processes